Events from the year 1625 in Sweden

Incumbents
 Monarch – Gustaf II Adolf

Events

 Great Stockholm Fire of 1625
 Second Phase of Polish–Swedish War started.

Births

 10 October - Erik Dahlbergh, engineer and field marshal   (died 1703) 
 Margareta Beijer, managing director of the Swedish post office (died 1675) 
 Armegot Printz, colonial noblewoman  (died 1695)

Deaths

 8 December - Christina of Holstein-Gottorp, queen consort  (born 1573)

References

 
Years of the 17th century in Sweden
Sweden